Ella-Rae Kirby-Smith (born 21 February 1998) is an English actress and model. She began modeling in 2014 and rose to fame for her portrayal of Phoebe in Clique and Nix in the AMC martial arts drama series Into the Badlands.

Early life 
Smith is from Bristol and has two younger siblings. She attended Cotham School. She was scouted at the age of 13 to become a model during a school trip to Paris and signed her first contract in 2014.

Career 
Smith's first television role was in Marley's Ghosts, where she played the role of Mia for two episodes and her film debut was in Butterfly Kisses that premiere in 2017. She also started in the television series, Clique as Phoebe. She has started in numerous short films in the past two years. In 2017, she was cast to play the role of Nix in Into the Badlands. She played one of Madame M's crew-members in the film Hobbs & Shaw. She also plays the role of Daisy Hoy in the Netflix series The Stranger.

Filmography

Film

Television

References

External links
 
 
 

Living people
1998 births
21st-century English actresses
British child models
English female models
English film actresses
English television actresses
Actresses from Bristol